Laurin Luther Henry (born May 23, 1921) is an American academic. He worked as a researcher, consultant, and educator. He is considered an expert on the subject of United States presidential transitions.

Early life
Henry was born in Kankakee, Illinois on May 23, 1921.

Education
Henry earned his bachelor's degree from DePauw University, graduating in 1942 with honors. After serving in the U.S. Navy from 1942 to 1946, he received his Master of Arts and Ph.D. in philosophy from the University of Chicago in 1948 and 1960, respectively.

Henry was affiliated with Phi Beta Kappa and Phi Kappa Phi.

Military service
During World War II, Henry served in the United States Navy. He was stationed at a base in northern Idaho, where he served as an administrative specialist. He rose to the rank of chief petty officer. His service lasted three and a half years, from 1942 through 1946.

Career
Henry worked as a staff assistant at the Public Administration Clearing House in Chicago and Washington, DC, from 1950 to 1955. He left this job to work for the Brookings Institution independent research institute, where he worked from 1955 through 1964. He worked first as a senior research associate, before becoming a senior staff member in 1961.

Henry is regarded to be an expert on United States presidential transitions. In 1960, Henry became involved in the Brookings Institution's work assessing United States presidential transitions. He was the primary research associate for the Brookings Institution 1960 - 1961 Study on Presidential Transition. This study saw its discussions attended by liaisons from the Dwight D. Eisenhower White House and the campaigns of 1960 major party presidential nominees John F. Kennedy and Richard Nixon. It, ultimately, helped to inform the presidential transition of John F. Kennedy. In addition to contributing to various publications, Henry wrote Presidential Transitions in 1960 and The Presidential Election and Transition, 1960 – 1961 in 1961 (the latter being written in collaboration with P.T. David). His 1960 book has been regarded as the first systemic study of United States presidential transitions, and would remain the only such book for quite some time. In writing his own 1986 book on United States presidential transitions, Carl M. Bauer would write that Henry's Presidential Transitions had previously been the only book on the topic "to treat them systematically". In 1961, his doctoral dissertation on the subject received the Leonard D. White Award.

From 1964 through 1978, Henry was a professor of government and foreign affairs at the University of Virginia. From 1978 through 1986, he was the dean of the School of Community of Public Affairs at Virginia Commonwealth University. After this, he spent two years as a professor at Virginia Commonwealth University, before becoming a professor emeritus in 1987. From 1988 through 1995, he would be a guest scholar at the University of Virginia and a visiting professor at Johns Hopkins University.

Henry worked at the Federal Executive Institute, where he worked to prepare executives for top-level jobs in civil service. He also, in this job,  worked as a consultant for numerous federal agencies, such as the Bureau of the Budget, General Accounting Office, and NASA. Henry also served as a consultant to the Alaska State Commission.

Henry is a fellow of the National Academy of Public Administration. Henry has been affiliated with the Network of Schools of Public Policy Affairs and Administration, at one time serving as its president. He was also a contributor and board member of the Inter-University Case Program, producing materials for educating on the subject public administration that have been described as "pioneering". In 2018, he was given the Albert Nelson Marquis Lifetime Achievement award.

As of March 2019, Henry lives in Charlottesville, Virginia.

Personal life
Henry was married Kathleen Jane Stephan and had two children. He wife died, leaving him a widower.

References

External links
 Papers of Laurin L. Henry, Dwight D. Eisenhower Presidential Library
 Personal Papers of Laurin L. Henry, John F. Kennedy Presidential Library

1921 births
Living people
Brookings Institution people
DePauw University alumni
People from Kankakee, Illinois
University of Chicago alumni
University of Virginia faculty
Virginia Commonwealth University faculty
Johns Hopkins University faculty
American consultants
United States Navy personnel of World War II
United States Navy chiefs